Coleophora lentella is a moth of the family Coleophoridae. It is found in North America, including New York and Ontario.

The larvae feed on the leaves of Betula lenta and Betula lutea. They create a spatulate leaf case.

References

lentella
Moths described in 1915
Moths of North America